Jim Calarco is an actor and a media and drama instructor.

Early life 
Calarco's hometown is North Bay, Ontario.

Career

Teaching and stage
He taught media and drama classes from 1969 to 2000. His career began when he was working as the Artistic Director of Caruso's Dinner Theatre in North Bay in 1981 and 1982.  Claire and Jim Calarco formed Pine Creek Theatre Productions in 1983, producing independent freelance theatre. Calarco was a drama consultant with the Near North School Board of Education prior to retirement in 2000.

After retiring from teaching, Calarco focused his career exclusively on film and television.

Film and television 
Calarco became a board member of Loon Film Productions and of Nipissing University's Nipissing Stage in 2007. He served as a member of the Theatrical Advisory Committee for Canadore College between 2008 and 2009. Calarco worked through various casting agencies to seek new talent within northern Ontario by promoting original, innovative film development as a spokesperson for the Show Us Your Shorts film competition. In 2008, he formed Real to Reel BG Agency with Kate Adams.

Calarco is a member of ACTRA and the Actors' Equity Association. His most recent works include A Dark Truth, The Riverbank (also known as Tracing Iris) and One Wish. One Wish won the Mexico City International Film Festival's Golden Palm Award and the Canada International Film Festival's Award of Excellence.

In 2010, Calarco established North Star Talent Agency with producer Brigitte Kingsley to better represent actors from northern Ontario. Within the same year he started Real to Reel BG Agency with Kate Adams. In 2011, Calarco started Castnorth, a film and television casting and audition agency.

Many of Calarco's latest movies have been available on Super Channel, including Dark Rising 1 and 2, A Dark Truth, High Chicago, The Riverbank and The Entitled.

North Bay Nugget was released in September 2013: "Calarco can now add the Northern Flicks Award — top honours in CTV Television Network Best in Shorts competition — to his list of awards from a film that put the spotlight on dementia and Alzheimer's."

Awards
Calarco won the Quonta Best Actor award in 1973 and in 2008 was inducted into the Northern Ontario Entertainers Hall of Fame.  Many of Calarco’s recent shorts have been nominated for awards, some as finalists, and his movies won many festival awards.
1973	How The Other Half Lives – Best Actor Quonta Festival - Frank
2007	That Was Easy – Best Screenplay from Music and Film in Motion Awards, Nomination and finalist from Music in Film and Motion Festival
2008	Inducted into the Northern Ontario Entertainers Hall of Fame
2011	The House - CTV Best In Shorts: Film North: Finalist, Mexico City International Film Festival: Silver Palm Award, ICFILMS (Milan): Top Twenty finalist
2012	One Wish — Mexico City International Film Festival: Golden Palm Award, Canada International Film Festival: Award of Excellence
2013	Strangers – Mexico City International Film Festival: Bronze Palm Award, Canada International Film Festival: Award of Excellence, Cinéfest Sudbury International Film Festival Northern Flicks Award and winner at The Rimini Italy Film Festival

Personal life
Calarco and his wife Claire married in 1969.

Filmography
Calarco has performed as an actor, producer, writer, director, casting director, musician and voiceover artist.

Acting

Writer, producer and/or director

Other crew

References

Year of birth missing (living people)
Living people
Male actors from Ontario
Drama teachers
Canadian male television actors
People from North Bay, Ontario
Canadian male film actors